Live 2006 may refer to:
2006 Live live album by the Danish progressive metal band Royal Hunt
Carrie Underwood: Live 2006 first concert tour by American country singer, Carrie Underwood
Ringo Starr & His All Starr Band Live 2006